Windsor station or Windsor railway station may refer to:

Australia
 Windsor railway station, Brisbane
 Windsor railway station, Sydney
 Windsor railway station, Melbourne

Canada
 Windsor Station (Montreal)
 Windsor station (Nova Scotia)
 Windsor station (Ontario)
 Windsor station (Michigan Central Railroad), also in Windsor, Ontario

United Kingdom 
 Windsor & Eton Riverside railway station
 Windsor & Eton Central railway station
 Windsor railway station (Northern Ireland), a disused station in Belfast

United States 
Windsor station (California)
Windsor station (Connecticut)
Windsor Locks station, Connecticut
Windsor station (Vermont)

See also
 Windsor (disambiguation)